Tu Ky is a district (huyện) of Hải Dương province in the Red River Delta region of Vietnam.

As of 2003 the district had a population of 167,664. The district capital lies at Tứ Kỳ.

References

Districts of Hải Dương province